Viktor Yevgenyevich Zernov (born 3 January 1945) is a Russian professional football coach and a former player.

External links
 

1945 births
Footballers from Moscow
Living people
Soviet footballers
FC Spartak Tambov players
FC Yenisey Krasnoyarsk players
FC Saturn Ramenskoye players
Soviet football managers
Russian football managers
Russian expatriate football managers
Expatriate football managers in Myanmar
PFC Spartak Nalchik managers
Expatriate football managers in Iran
FC Chernomorets Novorossiysk managers
Russian Premier League managers
FC Partizan Minsk managers
Expatriate football managers in Belarus
Association football defenders